Kureh-ye Sofla (also Romanized as Kūreh-ye Soflá; also known as Kūreh-ye Pā'īn) is a village in Anzal-e Jonubi Rural District, Anzal District, Urmia County, West Azerbaijan Province, Iran. At the 2006 census, its population was 318, in 54 families.

References 

Populated places in Urmia County